Sims Creek is a  tributary of the Tangipahoa River in the 8th Ward of Tangipahoa Parish, Louisiana. It flows generally southeast from near Robert, and is joined about halfway down its course by its longest tributary, P-Kaw-Shun Creek, which begins north of Lorraine and flows southwest, passing under US 190 and Interstate 12, to its confluence with Sims Creek. The creek is part of the Lake Pontchartrain Basin and thus sensitive to its ecology. In 2007, the attorney general of Louisiana issued a legal opinion that a private fence could not lawfully be constructed across Sims Creek, because of its importance to public drainage.

Notes

Rivers of Louisiana
Rivers of Tangipahoa Parish, Louisiana